Lhasang Tsering (born in 1952) is a Tibetan poet, writer, and activist. He was President of the Tibetan Youth Congress and a founding director of Amnye Machen Institute in Dharamshala, India. He is a vociferous and ardent advocate of Tibet's independence and a passionate lover of literature.

Early life 
Lhasang Tsering was born in 1952 in Labrang Kosa in the Tradun region of Western Tibet. However, due to the Chinese occupation of Tibet, his parents escaped to India along with his two older brothers.

In 1962, he was admitted to study at the Central School for Tibetans in Mussoorie. Thereafter, he was selected from the pool of students to study at the Wynberg Allen School in Mussoorie, India.

In 1972 he got an opportunity to attend a medical school at the Johns Hopkins University in the United States, instead, he declined the opportunity and decided to join the Tibetan resistance force based in Mustang, Nepal.

Career 
After completing his school in 1972 he joined the Tibetan resistance forces based in Mustang, Western Nepal. However, the Mustang base camp was closed in 1974 and he had to return to Dharamshala after two years, where he worked briefly at the Tibetan office of Research and Analysis.

He joined the Tibetan Children's Village (TCV) in Dharamshala and expanded the elementary school into high school under the guidance of its director Jetsun Pema. He served as TCV its Principal from 1976 to 1982.

During his time at the Tibetan Children's Village, he was one of the people instrumental in establishing TCV schools in Ladakh and in Bylakuppe, Karnataka. He also helped develop the TCV school in Lower Dharamshala.

In March 1983, on instructions from the Dalai Lama, he joined the Information Office of the Tibetan exile government. While working at the Information Office he helped develop the Narthang publications project, planned the computerization of the Tibetan language, and a new font for printing Tibetan.

In 1986 he was elected as the President of the Tibetan Youth Congress, Dharamshala. In 1989, he was re-elected as President, however, due to his opposition to the 'Middle-Way Policy' he resigned in 1990.

Lhasang Tsering edited the Tibetan Review as an Acting Editor between May–December 1986, when its editor Tsering Wangyal went to United States for an internship offered by the Alfred Friendly Press Fellowship.

Amnye Machen Institute 
In 1992, Tashi Tsering, Pema Bhum, Jamyang Norbu and Lhasang Tsering founded the Amnye Machen Institute (Tibetan Centre for Advanced Studies). The institute aimed at promoting an international and secular culture within traditional Tibetan society.

He worked as its director as a full-time volunteer at the institute, helping with translation, editing, general administration, and fund-raising. In 1999, he resigned from the institute after running it single-handedly for 6 years.

Bookstore 
Lhasang Tsering opened the first bookstore in McLeod Ganj, called Bookworm, wanting to promote and enhance the reading culture in the Tibetan exile capital.

Writing 
After retiring from the Amnye Machen Institute in 1999, he devoted more time in writing, researching, and talking to students and journalists about Tibet.

He has published a few books. His first book was Tomorrow and Other Poems, published in 2003. His second book Ocean of Melody, published in 2009, was a translation of the Songs of the Sixth Dalai Lama. In 2012, he published his third book Hold On and other Verses.

He has also written articles, some of which are published on his page at TibetWrites.

Books 

 Tomorrow and Other Poems
 Ocean of Melody
 Hold On and other Verses.

References

Living people
Tibet freedom activists
Tibetan writers
1952 births